The 2009–10 Championnat de France Amateurs season was the 12th edition of the competition since its establishment. The competition officially began on 8 August 2009 and ended in May 2010. The competition consisted of 73 clubs spread into four parallel groups of 18 with one of the groups containing 19 clubs. It is open to reserve teams in France and amateur clubs in France, although only the amateur clubs are eligible for promotion to the Championnat National. The highest-placed amateur team in each pool are promoted, replaced by the four lowest-placed in the Championnat.

DNGC Rulings 
All clubs that secured CFA status for the 2009–10 season were subject to approval by the DNCG before becoming eligible to participate.

Following the DNCG's annual report on clubs, on 25 June, it was announced that six clubs had been relegated from the National to lower divisions. AS Beauvais, SO Cassis Carnoux, CS Louhans-Cuiseaux, and FC Libourne Saint-Seurin were relegated to the Championnat de France Amateurs. Besançon RC, US Luzenac, and FC Rouen, who were all recently promoted, were relegated to Championnat de France Amateurs 2, while FC Sète and Calais RUFC were relegated to the Division d'Honneur. All clubs relegated were allowed to appeal the decision.

Following an appeal from the aforementioned clubs, FC Rouen, AS Beauvais, and US Luzenac had their appeals successfully overturned meaning they will remain in the Championnat National. Some clubs were, however, unsuccessful. FC Sète's appeal was upheld relegating them to the Division d'Honneur. Stade Plabennecois will replace them in the Championnat National. FC Libourne Saint-Seurin, Besançon RC, and Calais RUFC appeals were also rejected by the DNCG, however, all three clubs decided to take their case to the CNOSF, the National Sporting Committee of France which governs sport in France. Both Calais and Besançon's rulings were determined on 23 July. The CNOSF determined that Besançon should be relegated to the CFA and not CFA 2, while Calais should respect and oblige the DNCG's ruling relegated them to CFA 2.

Libourne's ruling was determined on 27 July, when the CNOSF informed the club that they should honor the DNCG's ruling and suffer relegation to the CFA. Libourne's chairman Bernard Layda responded by announcing the club will file for bankruptcy, restructure themselves, and oblige the ruling. Besançon and Libourne are slated to be replaced by ES Fréjus and AS Moulins.

Both CS Louhans-Cuiseaux and SO Cassis Carnoux had their appeals heard by the DNCG on 9 July. On 10 July, the DNGC ruled that both Louhans-Cuiseaux and Cassis-Carnoux rulings had been overturned meaning they will play in the Championnat National this season.

On 29 July, the French Football Federation unanimously suspended newly promoted CFA club Toulouse Rodéo FC from the league following abnormalities detected in the club's use of non-licensed players. The club was replaced by Red Star Saint-Ouen, who were relegated from the CFA last year.

On 6 August, just three days before the start of the season, the CNSOF ruled that CFA 2 club Olympique Saumur would be allowed promotion to the CFA on the assumption that the club was ranked second behind Les Herbiers VF in terms of the promotion chart following a current CFA club's relegation by means of a federation ruling. With Besançon's relegation to the CFA, it has been determined that two groups would have an allocation of 20 clubs, while one group would have an allocation of 19 clubs. Due to the sudden circumstances, on 7 August, the FFF devised a brand new schedule for the CFA. The federation also announced that they had rejected the CNOSF's proposal for integrating Saumur into the CFA. Saumur responding by announcing their intent to appeal the judgment in Administrative Court.

Promotion and relegation from 2008–09 

Promoted from CFA 2
 Champions, Groupe A: Marck
 Champions, Groupe B: Drancy
 Champions, Groupe C: Épinal
 Champions, Groupe D: Grenoble B
 2nd Place, Groupe E: Le Pontet1
 Champions, Groupe F: Toulouse Fontaines
 2nd Place, Groupe G: Les Herbiers2
 Champions, Groupe H: Carquefou
 2nd Place, Groupe B : Ivry-sur-Seine
 2nd Place, Groupe C : Amneville
 2nd Place, Groupe D : Bourg-Peronnas
 2nd Place, Groupe H : Avranches

1Saint-Raphael finished Champions, but cannot participate in next season's CFA because the club will fuse with ES Fréjus to form a new club. As such, Le Pontet was allowed to take their promotion spot.

2Tours B finished Champions, but cannot participate in CFA because the DNCG deemed the formation structure of the reserve inadequate. Les Herbiers were allowed to take their promotion spot.

Teams relegated from Championnat National 2009–10
 17th Place: Niort
 18th Place: Calais
 19th Place: Cherbourg
 20th Place: L'Entente

Teams promoted to Championnat National 2009–10
 Champions, Groupe A: Besançon
 Champions, Groupe B: Hyères
 Champions, Groupe C: Luzenac
 Champions, Groupe D: Rouen

Relegated from CFA to CFA 2
 16th Place, Groupe A: Vesoul
 17th Place, Groupe A: Metz B
 18th Place, Groupe A: Sainte-Geneviève
 16th Place, Groupe B: Saint-Étienne B
 17th Place, Groupe B: Saint-Priest
 18th Place, Groupe B: AS Monaco B
 16th Place, Groupe C: Châtellerault
 17th Place, Groupe C: Bordelais
 18th Place, Groupe C: Bergerac
 16th Place, Groupe D: Red Star
 17th Place, Groupe D: Guingamp B
 18th Place, Groupe D: Vitré

League Tables 
Last updated: 30 May 2010

Groupe A

Groupe B 

1 Montceau Bourgogne have been docked 3 points.

Groupe C 

2 Bordeaux Reserves have been docked 5 points.

Groupe D 

3 Racing have been docked 3 points due to financial irregularities.

Playoffs 
The Championnat de France Amateurs playoffs are designated for only the professional clubs B teams playing in the league. The best finishing professional reserve club in each group will advance to the playoffs where they will face each other at a site to be determined. The semi-final opponents are determined by the best finishing place. The best finishing reserve club will be awarded the 1st seed, while the worst finishing reserve club of the four will be awarded the 4th seed.

Semi-finals

Final

Top goalscorers 
''Last updated: 17 April 2010

Groupe A

Groupe B

Groupe C

Groupe D

References

External links 
 CFA Official Page
 CFA Standings and Statistics
 CFA Statistics

Championnat National 2 seasons
4
France

fr:Championnat de France Amateurs
it:Championnat de France Amateurs
ko:샹피오나 드 프랑스 아마퇴르
nl:Championnat de France Amateurs
pl:Championnat de France Amateurs.